Guillermo Ross (1695 – 1757) was a Scottish army officer belonging to the Clan Ross and Munro by maternal line. He had a great military and political activity in the Río de la Plata, occupying the positions of sergeant major and governor of Buenos Aires.

Biography 

He was son of Alexander Ross and Margaret Munro Forrester, belonging to a noble Scottish family. He arrived at the Port of Buenos Aires as a member of the Company of the Real Asiento de Inglaterra. He held honorary positions in the city, being appointed as Sargento Mayor de la Plaza and served on an interim basis the governorship of Buenos Aires. He owned a large number of properties in the Río de la Plata territories and in his native country. His legal affairs were entrusted to Domingo de Basavilbaso and Francisco de Vieyra, in charge of his business in Buenos Aires, and Robert Munro, a relative in charge of his farm in Little Tarrel, Scottish Highlands.

His condition of Protestant brought him many problems to establish himself in Buenos Aires colonial. In 1740, he obtained permission of the authorities to marry with María Antonia Jacinta del Pozo Silva, daughter of Francisco Alonso del Pozo Silva and Antonia de Toledo y Ojeda, belonging to a distinguished family of the city. His daughters, María Cristina Ross and Maria Aurelia Ross, were married to Gregorio Ramos Mexía and Francisco Antonio Basavilbaso, two distinguished Spanish government officials.

His son, Jorge Ross del Pozo Silva was baptized on 17 July 1742, being his godfather Roberto Young, a well-known doctor of the city of Scottish origin. Through his grandsons, Hilario Ramos Mexía and Ildefonso Ramos Mexía, the blood of Guillermo Ross was present during the May Revolution of 1810, events that gave origin to the establishment of the Argentine Republic.

His descendant Nicanor Costa Méndez, was Minister of Foreign Affairs during the Guerra de las Malvinas.

References

External links 
Protocolos: Registro No. 3, 1716-1800
Bautismos 1732-1752

People from Buenos Aires
Spanish colonial governors and administrators
18th-century Scottish people
Scottish soldiers
Governors of the Río de la Plata
Río de la Plata
Clan Ross
Clan Munro